"Diddle, Diddle, Dumpling, My Son John" is an English language nursery rhyme. It has a Roud Folk Song Index number of 19709.

Lyrics 
The most commonly used modern version is:

Diddle, diddle, dumpling, my son John,
Went to bed with his trousers on;
One shoe off, and the other shoe on,
Diddle, diddle, dumpling, my son John.

Alternate versions include:

Diddle diddle dumpling, my son John
Went to bed with his britches on.
One shoe off, and one shoe on;
Diddle diddle dumpling, my son John.

Deedle, deedle, dumpling, my son John,
Went to bed with his stockings on;
One shoe off, and one shoe on,
Deedle, deedle, dumpling, my son John.

Origins 
The rhyme is first recorded in The Newest Christmas Box published in London around 1797. It may be derived from 'Diddle, diddle, diddle Dumpling', a traditional street cry of hot dumpling sellers.

References 

 BBC 'Inside number 9' TV episode with the same name
 Sky's British black comedy 'Hunderby', set in the 1830s, features the song as evening entertainment accompanied by a traditional crumhorn.

English children's songs
Street cries
Year of song unknown
English nursery rhymes
Songwriter unknown